The Famenne Ardenne Classic is a one-day professional cycling race held annually in Belgium since 2017. It is part of UCI Europe Tour in category 1.1. It starts and arrives in Marche-en-Famenne.

Winners

References

Cycle races in Belgium
UCI Europe Tour races
Recurring sporting events established in 2017